Kelly Sheehan (born July 26, 1983), also known as "Madame Buttons", is a songwriter and recording engineer from Los Angeles.

Career
Kelly Sheehan has written songs for Kylie Minogue, Beyoncé, DJ Khaled, Mary J. Blige and others. She has engineered for Justin Bieber, Mariah Carey, Chris Brown, Katharine McPhee, Tyrese, T.I., The Game, Akon, Ne-Yo, Charlie Wilson, Toni Braxton, Avant, Keri Hilson and others.
In 2011, Kelly Sheehan signed to Dr. Luke's Prescription Songs and Sony/ATV as a songwriter as well as BMI. She is managed by Roc Nation.

Discography
Recording Engineer

 Mariah Carey – Touch My Body – Island Def Jam 2008
 Nelly – La – Universal 2008
 Girlicious – Like Me – Geffen 2008
 Electrik Red – How To Be A Lady: Volume 1 – Def Jam 2009
 Ciara – Fantasy Ride – LaFace Records 2009
 Snoop Dogg – Malice N Wonderland – Capitol Records 2009
 Ciara – Ride – LaFace Records 2010

Songwriting

Albums

Nicki Minaj - Pink Friday: Roman Reloaded
 Young Forever

Jason Derulo - Future History (album)
 Pick Up The Pieces

DJ Khaled – We the Best Forever 
 It Ain't Over Til It's Over ft. Mary J. Blige, Fabulous & Jadakiss
 Sleep When I'm Gone featuring Cee-Lo, The Game & Busta Rhymes
 My Life featuring Akon & B.o.B

Katharine McPhee - Hysteria
 Hysteria
 Burn
 Only One
 Don't Need Love

Singles
Kylie Minogue - Into The Blue - Single
Karmin - Crash Your Party - Single
Rita Ora - How We Do (Party) - Single
Beyoncé - Grown Woman - Song

References

1983 births
Living people
Songwriters from California